Yonglong or  is a town under the administration of the county-level city of Jingshan, Hubei, China.

Administrative divisions

The town is made up of two communities and thirty villages:

Demographics

References

Township-level divisions of Hubei
Jingmen